Appius Annius Trebonius Gallus, sometimes known as Appius Annius Gallus (Greek: , flourished 2nd century) was a Roman senator and consul.

Gallus was born into the gens Annia and was a member of the venerable family of the Annii Regilli. He was the son of Appius Annius Trebonius Gallus, consul in 108, and an unnamed noblewoman. His paternal grandfather may have been Appius Annius Gallus, one of the suffect consuls in the year 67.

Through his father, Gallus was related to the senator Marcus Annius Verus, a brother-in-law of Emperor Hadrian and father of the Empress Faustina the Elder, wife of Antoninus Pius. Faustina the Elder was the mother of Empress Faustina the Younger and aunt of Emperor Marcus Aurelius. In 139 or 140, Annius Gallus served as a consul suffectus. Although he was a distinguished senator, not much is known on his life.

Gallus married Atilia Caucidia Tertulla, the daughter of the Senator Marcus Appius Bradua and Caucidia Tertulla. Tertulla bore him two children:
 Appius Annius Atilius Bradua, consul in 160
 Appia Annia Regilla Atilia Caucidia Tertulla, otherwise known as Aspasia Annia Regilla, who married the prominent Greek consul Herodes Atticus.

Aspasia Annia Regilla and her husband had built an outdoor monument called an exedra at Olympia, Greece, featuring statues honoring their various relatives and members of the ruling imperial family. Among the statues was one of a toga-wearing Annius Gallus, which survives without its head, and is on display at the Archaeological Museum of Olympia.

References

Sources
 http://www.vroma.org/~bmcmanus/women_civicdonors.html
 http://www.vroma.org/images/mcmanus_images/index13.html
 Σ. Θ. Φωτείνου, Ολυμπία - Οδηγός Αρχαιοτήτων, Συγκρότημα Γραφικών Τεχνών, Άνω Καλαμάκι Αθήνα, 1972
 G. Alföldy, Konsulat und Senatorenstand unter den Antoninen: Prosopographische Untersuchungen zur senatorischen Führungsschicht, Verlag Dr. Rudolf Habelt, 1977
 A. R. Birley, The Roman Government of Britain, Oxford University Press, 2005
 S. B. Pomeroy, The murder of Regilla: a case of domestic violence in antiquity, Harvard University Press, 2007

External links

Suffect consuls of Imperial Rome
2nd-century Romans
Annii
Trebonii